Manuel Jesus Ramirez Noguera (born September 7, 1982) is a Venezuelan baseball player who has played for the Venezuela national baseball team and professionally in the Milwaukee Brewers minor league system.

Venezuela national baseball team
Ramirez was a member of the team that earned a bronze medal in the 2006 Central American and Caribbean Games. He also played for Venezuela in the 2007 Pan American Games, the 2007 Baseball World Cup and the 2008 America Cup.

Professional career
He played in the Milwaukee Brewers minor league system from 2001 to 2004 for the AZL Brewers (2001), High Desert Mavericks (2002), Helena Brewers (2003) and Beloit Snappers (2004). Overall, he batted .280 with 24 home runs and 139 RBI in 257 games.

Personal life
He was born in Acarigua, Venezuela.

References

External links

1982 births
Venezuelan baseball players
Arizona League Brewers players
High Desert Mavericks players
Helena Brewers players
Beloit Snappers players
Living people
Central American and Caribbean Games bronze medalists for Venezuela
Competitors at the 2006 Central American and Caribbean Games
Central American and Caribbean Games medalists in baseball